The following elections occurred in the year 1908.

Africa
1908 Southern Rhodesian Legislative Council election

Australia
 1908 Adelaide by-election
 1908 Queensland state election

Europe
1908 Bulgarian parliamentary election
1908 Croatian parliamentary election
1908 Dalmatian parliamentary election
1908 Finnish parliamentary election
1908 Icelandic prohibition referendum
1908 Portuguese legislative election

United Kingdom
see also 
 1908 Ashburton by-election
 1908 Bewdley by-election   (Stanley Baldwin followed his father Alfred Baldwin)
 1908 Chelmsford by-election
 1908 County Carlow by-election
 1908 Dewsbury by-election
 1908 Dundee by-election
 1908 Hastings by-election
 1908 Kincardineshire by-election
 1908 Leeds South by-election
 1908 Manchester North West by-election
 1908 Montrose Burghs by-election
 1908 Newcastle-upon-Tyne by-election
 1908 North Leitrim by-election
 1908 Peckham by-election
 1908 Pembrokeshire by-election
 1908 Pudsey by-election
 1908 Sheffield Central by-election
 1908 St Austell by-election
 1908 Stirling Burghs by-election
 1908 West Carmarthenshire by-election
 1908 West Derbyshire by-election
 1908 Wolverhampton East by-election

North America

Canada
1908 Canadian federal election
1908 Edmonton municipal election
1908 New Brunswick general election
1908 Newfoundland general election
1908 Ontario general election
1908 Prince Edward Island general election
1908 Saskatchewan general election

United States
 1908 New York state election
 1908 South Carolina gubernatorial election
 1908 United States House of Representatives elections
 United States House of Representatives elections in California, 1908
 United States House of Representatives elections in South Carolina, 1908
 1908 United States presidential election
 1908 and 1909 United States Senate elections
 United States Senate election in South Carolina, 1908

Oceania

Australia
 1908 Adelaide by-election
 1908 Queensland state election

New Zealand
 1908 New Zealand general election
 1908 Tuapeka by-election

1908 elections in the United Kingdom
 
1908
Elections